Kelvin Lee Holly (born September 13, 1954 in Fort Dix, New Jersey, United States) is an American guitarist and musician.

Background
His musical career began in 1972 after graduating high school in Montgomery, Alabama.

Holly is the longtime guitarist for artists such as Little Richard, The Amazing Rhythm Aces, The Decoys, Pegi Young and The Survivors. As a studio musician, he has appeared on numerous albums, including those by Little Richard, Bobby Bland, Gregg Allman, Klaus Voormann and on various movie soundtracks.

In 1991, he moved to Muscle Shoals, Alabama, married, and began playing on recording sessions at the Muscle Shoals Sound Studios. The first major release was Bobby Bland's Years of Tears, on the Malaco label. He continues to play on many recording sessions today.

References

External links
 theacesforreal.com - Official website
 Kelvin Holly at MySpace

1954 births
American blues guitarists
American male guitarists
American rock guitarists
People from Muscle Shoals, Alabama
Living people
20th-century American guitarists
20th-century American male musicians